KERAFED is the top-level co-operative federation of coconut farmers in the southern Indian state of Kerala. KERAFED is also a producer and marketer of products based on coconut. It is the largest producer of coconut oil in India.

In July 2019, Minister for Agriculture V. S. Sunil Kumar launched the State-Level Raw Coconut Procurement Drive with the support of around 190 primary agriculture co-operative societies in Kerala.

History 

KERAFED was constituted by the Government of Kerala in 1987 with the objective of procuring the produce of coconut farmers to regulate marketing operations to retrieve the segment of price crunch they were confronting. A production unit relating to the sector was created in 1991 to crush and market copra procured from the farmers at remunerative price to relieve the section of price crunch and to cater the edible oil requirement of the society by maintaining high quality standards.

During the financial year 2009–2010, KERAFED procured 24,500 metric tonnes of copra for its operations.

Current operations 
KERAFED has two expeller oil extraction facilities—one at Karunagappalli, Kollam and the other at Naduvannur, Kozhikode—and caters to about 500,000 consumers in Kerala through 14,000 retail outlets.

The oil complex in Karunagappalli, is the largest coconut oil mill in the sub-continent with an installed capacity of 20 tonnes per day (TPD) (7504 TPA, 2009–2010). The facility at Naduvannur provides a production of 7.5 TPD (2693 TPA, 2009–2010). Total production was about 10,000 metric tonnes during the year 2009–2010.

During this period, the facilities used 15,887 metric tonnes of copra and generated 5,111 metric tonnes of "pinnack" by-product.

Products 
"KERA" brand of coconut oil is sold in HDPE bottles of 100 ml, 200 ml and 500 ml; PET bottles of 1000 ml; and polythene pouches of 500 ml and 1000 ml.

References

External links 
 
 Food and Beverage News
 The Hindu: Feb 20, 2009
 The Hindu: Aug 22, 2009
 The Hindu: Dec 04, 2010

Coconut organizations
Cooperatives in Kerala
Agricultural marketing in India
Commodity markets in Kerala
Organisations based in Thiruvananthapuram
1987 establishments in Kerala
Agriculture companies established in 1987
Marketing companies established in 1987
Agricultural cooperatives in India
Agricultural organisations based in India